Thutthipattu is a census town in Vellore district in the Indian state of Tamil Nadu.

Demographics
 India census, Thutthipattu had a population of 7068. Males constitute 49% of the population and females 51%. Thutthipattu has an average literacy rate of 64%, higher than the national average of 59.5%: male literacy is 73%, and female literacy is 56%. In Thutthipattu, 12% of the population is under 6 years of age.

References

Cities and towns in Vellore district